Neeraj Shridhar is an Indian film composer and singer-songwriter who was the lead vocalist of Indian pop and rock group Bombay Vikings. Bombay Vikings became popular with remix hits like "Kya Soorat Hai", "Woh Chali" and "Chod Do Anchal."

Career

Bombay Vikings
Bombay Vikings is a pop and rock group that combines Indian and classical music. It was formed in 1994.

Career

Neeraj started working as a Bollywood playback singer in 2006 with the song "Tumko Dekha" for the film God Tussi Great Ho although this film got released later. He also sang "Halke Halke" in Honeymoon Travels Pvt. Ltd. and "Bhagam Bhaag" from Bhagam Bhaag in the same year. After this, Neeraj sang songs like "Ticket To Hollywood" (Jhoom Barabar Jhoom), "Heyy Babyy" (Heyy Babyy),  "Ishq Subhanallah" (Mere Baap Pehle Aap), "Ishq Ka Kalma" (Dhan Dhana Dhan Goal), and the biggest of them all "Bhool Bhulaiyaa" (Bhool Bhulaiyaa), commonly known as "Hare Raam Hare Raam." This Akshay Kumar star song was the biggest hit of the year and was nominated for the Filmfare Awards with the songs "Ticket To Hollywood" and "Heyy Baby." Neeraj also co-wrote the song "Bhool Bhulaiya" with Sameer.

Success in Bollywood
In 2008, Neeraj had all of his songs superhits. He sang the following songs for their respective films: 'Race Saanson Ki', 'Race Is On My Mind' and 'Sexy Lady' (Race), 'Chandni Chowk To China' (Chandni Chowk To China), 'Love Mera Hit', and 'Rockin' And Reelin' (Billu), 'Vacancy' and 'Tha Karke' (Golmaal Returns), 'Aai Paapi' (Kismat Konnection), 'O Re Lakad' (Krazzy 4), 'Nobody Like You' (Mission Istanbul), 'Bas Ek King' and 'Talli Hua' (Singh Is Kinng), 'Sooni Sooni Raahein' and 'Main Ro Na Padoon' (Hum Phir Mile Na Mile), 'Pom Pom Pom' (Horn OK PLeasss), 'Samandar' (Mr. White Mr. Black), 'Khalbali' and 'Bhuri Bhuri' (Khalbali). This year he sang for a number of Bollywood actors, such as Saif Ali Khan, Shah Rukh Khan, Ajay Devgn, and Shahid Kapur. Neeraj sang a Telugu song called 'Om Namaste Bolo' from the film Ready, starring Genelia D'Souza. Neeraj wrote and sang the songs 'Ae Aa o' (Billu), 'Vacancy' (Golmaal Returns), and 'Aayaare' (Kolkata Knight Riders- 2 Hot 2 Cool).

Neeraj sang songs like ' Pal Yeh Aane Wala Pal' (Dhoondte Reh Jaaoge), 'Aaja Mahi' (8 x 10 Tasveer), Prem Ki Naiyya' (Ajab Prem Ki Ghazab Kahani), 'You Are My Love' (All The Best), 'Bebo' and 'Beautiful Woman' (Do Knot Disturb), 'Tension Lene Ka Nahi' (Jugaad), 'Jashn Hai Josh Hai' (Kal Kissne Dekha), 'Lakh Lakh Nakhre' (Kambakkht Ishq), 'Twist', 'Chor Bazari', and 'Aahun Aahun' (Love Aaj Kal), 'Tum Mile' (Tum Mile), 'Shiri Farhad' (Dulha Mil Gaya), 'Pe Pe Pein' (Chance Pe Dance).

In the year 2010, Neeraj slowed down on working on Bollywood songs, due to his involvement in his own album. Neeraj sang 'Mera Jeena Hai Kya' (Aashayein), which is altogether a different kind of song from what he had done in the past. Another recent song of his is the song 'Kya' from the Emran Hashmi-starrer film Crook: It's Good To Be Bad. This is his most recent hit. Neeraj also sang the songs 'Ale' and 'Desi Kali' of the film Golmaal 3, and 'Ajab Leher' of the film Break Ke Baad, starring Imran Khan and Deepika Padukone.

In 2011, Neeraj sang song like 'Rab Sab Se Sona' (F.A.L.T.U), 'Character Dheela' (Ready), 'Full Volume', 'Pyaar Mein' from (Thank You), 'Rascals', 'Parda Nasheen' from (Rascals), 'Jhak Maar Ke' from (Desi Boyz).

He received wide recognition after performing at Hans Raj College Festival "Confluence 2011" on 4 February 2011.

In 2012 Neeraj sang songs like 'Papa Toh Band Bajaye' (Housefull-2), 'I'll do the talking (steal the night)' in Agent Vinod and 'Tumhi Ho Bandhu' (Cocktail).

On 20 December 2012 he performed in Hyderabad during Qualcomm's annual event Qutumbotsav.
On 21 December 2012, he performed in Pune during Cybage's Annual Bash at Magarpatta city.
On 8 February 2014, he performed in Noida during Amity University's annual fest AYF.

Personal life
Neeraj is married to Nikila Shridhar and has one son, Nevan and one daughter, Rohini.

Awards and nominations
 Nominated: Screen Award for Best Playback Singer – Male (2010): Tum Mile
 Nominated: Stardust Award for New Musical Sensation – Male (2008): Ticket To Hollywood
 Nominated: Stardust Award for New Musical Sensation – Male (2008): Bhool Bhulaiyaa
 Nominated: IIFA Award for Best Male Playback Singer (2008): Bhool Bhulaiyaa

Lyricist
 Billu (13 February 2009) (Released)
 Golmaal Returns (29 October 2008) (Released)

As a composer
 8 x 10 Tasveer (3 April 2009) (Released)
 Irada (17 February 2017) (Released)

Bombay Vikings discography and studio albums 

 U n I (2011)
 Zara Nazron Se Kehdo (2006)
 Chhodh Do Aanchal (2004)
 Hum To Anything Karega - Fusion Remixes (2004)
 The Best of Bombay Vikings (2003)
 Hawa Mein Udati Jaaye (2002)
 Woh Chali (2001)
 Kya Soorat Hai (1999)

Playback singer

References

External links
 Neeraj Shridhar Official Site
 
 Bombay Vikings Official Site
 Neeraj Shridhar Fan Page

Living people
Bollywood playback singers
Indian male pop singers
Indian male composers
Indian male playback singers
1978 births
Punjabi people